Gerhard J. Woeginger (31 May 1964 – 1 April 2022) was an Austrian mathematician and computer scientist who worked in Germany as a professor at RWTH Aachen University, where he chaired the algorithms and complexity group in the department of computer science.

Biography 
Woeginger was born on 31 May 1964 in Graz, Austria. He obtained a diploma from the Graz University of Technology (TU Graz) in 1987, and completed his Ph.D. at TU Graz 1991 under the supervision of Franz Rendl. He worked on the faculty of TU Graz from 1991 to 2001, where he completed his habilitation in 1995. He then moved to the University of Twente from 2001 to 2004, to TU Eindhoven, from 2004 to 2016, and finally to RWTH Aachen in 2016.

He was program chair of the European Symposium on Algorithms in 1997, of the algorithms track of the International Colloquium on Automata, Languages and Programming in 2003, of the European Conference on Operational Research in 2009, and of several other conferences.

In 1996, Woeginger won the Start-Preis, the highest Austrian award for scientists under the age of 35. He won a Humboldt Research Award in 2011.
In 2014, he was elected to the Academia Europaea.

Woeginger died on 1 April 2022, at the age of 57.

References

External links
Home page
Google scholar profile

1964 births
2022 deaths
Scientists from Graz
Austrian mathematicians
Austrian computer scientists
Theoretical computer scientists
Operations researchers
Graz University of Technology alumni
Academic staff of the Graz University of Technology
Academic staff of the University of Twente
Academic staff of the Eindhoven University of Technology
Academic staff of RWTH Aachen University
Members of Academia Europaea